Friedrich "Fritz" Kerr (2 April 1892 – 9 October 1974) was an Austrian footballer and football manager. He played for Wiener AC and Hakoah Wien. He coached Hasmonea Lemberg, Stuttgarter Kickers, Estonia, FC Aarau, RC Strasbourg, FC Mulhouse, Lausanne Sports and FC St. Gallen.

References

External links
 Fritz Kerr (Friedrich Konus) at KickersArchiv.de 
 

1892 births
1974 deaths
Austrian footballers
Austria international footballers
SC Hakoah Wien footballers
Austrian football managers
RC Strasbourg Alsace managers
FC Mulhouse managers
FC Lausanne-Sport managers
FC St. Gallen managers
Expatriate football managers in Switzerland
FC Aarau managers
Stuttgarter Kickers managers
Austrian expatriate football managers
Estonia national football team managers
Expatriate football managers in Estonia
Association football defenders
Footballers from Vienna